The Georgetown East Main Street Residential District is a  historic district located in Georgetown, Kentucky. The area was added to the U.S. National Register of Historic Places in 1978.  It included 41 contributing buildings.

The district has an irregular shape, generally running along Main St. between Warrendale Ave. and Mulberry St.

A few properties in the district are:
Scott County Post Office (1914–15)
Georgetown Presbyterian (1865–70), brick Gothic Revival church
Shropshire House, separately listed
James Emison House (1820), one half of a two-story double brick house

References

Geography of Scott County, Kentucky
Buildings and structures in Georgetown, Kentucky
Historic districts on the National Register of Historic Places in Kentucky
National Register of Historic Places in Scott County, Kentucky